is a railway station located in the city of Kitaakita, Akita Prefecture, Japan, operated by the third sector railway operator Akita Nairiku Jūkan Railway.

Lines
Kobuchi Station is served by the Nariku Line, and is located 29.1 km from the terminus of the line at Takanosu Station.

Station layout
The station consists of one side platform serving a single bi-directional track. The station is unattended.

Adjacent stations

History
Kobuchi Station opened on September 25, 1936 as a station on the Japanese Government Railways (JGR) Aniai Line, serving the town of Ani, Akita. The JGR became the Japan National Railways (JNR) after World War II, and the line was extended to Hitachinai Station by October 15, 1963. The line was privatized on November 1, 1986, becoming the Akita Nairiku Jūkan Railway.

Surrounding area
 
Ani River

External links

 Nairiku Railway Station information 

Railway stations in Japan opened in 1936
Railway stations in Akita Prefecture
Kitaakita